One Airlines was a Chilean airline that provided air transportation for passengers and regular charters for mining, since October 2013. Initially they used a fleet of two Boeing 737-400s, operated by Xtra Airlines. It was in a semi-operational state, flying for mining operations in northern Chile, operating with a single 737-300 leased from GECAS. It had its headquarters established in the Comodoro Arturo Merino Benítez International Airport in Santiago de Chile. On June 24, 2020, the airline ceased all operations.

History 
Founded in July 2013 One Airlines is a Chilean airline providing air transportation services and charter passenger Sinami since 2013 . The operations center is located in the Comodoro Arturo Merino Benitez Airport in Santiago de Chile.

The airline announced on June 24, 2020, that it has ceased operations due to the hard financial situation caused by the COVID-19 crisis. The owner and Chairman, Claudio Fischer Llop, blamed the competition from SKY, JetSMART, and LATAM, which are offering charters at prices that ONE cannot compete with, and the lack of financial support from the Chilean government, making ONE’s operation non-viable during the present and near future.

Destinations

Fleet

Current Fleet
The One Airlines fleet consists of the following aircraft (as of August 2019):

Former fleet
The airline previously operated the following aircraft:
 2 Boeing 737-400

References

External links 

 Official website

Defunct airlines of Chile
Airlines established in 2013
Airlines disestablished in 2020
Chilean companies established in 2013
2013 establishments in Chile
2020 disestablishments in Chile